Urban Tigner Holmes III (June 12, 1930 – August 6, 1981) was an Episcopal priest, theologian, and academic during the twentieth century. He was the son of Urban T. Holmes Jr. and Margaret Allan Gemmell Holmes. Following studies at the University of North Carolina, he studied for the priesthood at the former Philadelphia Divinity School. He served as dean of the School of Theology of the University of the South from 1973 until his death. His biggest accomplishment while in Sewanee was the establishment of the Education for Ministry program.

Selected publications 
 To Speak of God: Theology for Beginners, Seabury Press, 1974
 To Be a Priest: Perspectives on Vocation and Ordination, HarperCollins Publishers, 1975 (co-editor with Robert E. Terwilliger)
 Male and Female: Christian Approaches to Sexuality, Seabury Press, 1976 (co-editor with Ruth Tiffany Barnhouse)
 The Priest in Community: Exploring the Roots of Ministry, Seabury Press, 1978
 Ministry and Imagination, HarperCollins Publishers, 1981
 Turning to Christ: A Theology of Renewal and Evangelization, Seabury Press, 1981
 A History of Christian Spirituality: An Analytical Introduction, HarperCollins Publishers, 1981
 What is Anglicanism?, "The Anglican Studies Series", Morehouse Publishing, 1982
 Christian Believing, "The Church's Teaching Series", HarperCollins Publishers, 1984 (co-author with John H. Westerhoff III)

References 
 William Stevens Powell, editor, Dictionary of North Carolina Biography, volume three, p. 181.

External links 
Bibliographic directory from Project Canterbury
Obituary - Episcopal News Service

1930 births
1981 deaths
20th-century American theologians
American Episcopal priests
American Episcopal theologians
20th-century American Episcopalians
20th-century American clergy